James William McCarty (born June 1, 1945) is an American blues rock guitarist from Detroit, Michigan. He has performed with Mitch Ryder and The Detroit Wheels, the Buddy Miles Express, Cactus, The Rockets, the Detroit Blues Band, and more recently, Mystery Train. Since about 2014 Jim McCarty has joined forces with Detroit blues guitarist/songwriter Kenny Parker in The Kenny Parker Band along with several other veteran Detroit blues/rock musicians. He also makes guest appearances with other Detroit bands, most notably for an annual pre New Year's Eve party at one of his favorite clubs, "Callahan's", with The Millionaires, a nine piece jump blues band.

He also recorded with Jimi Hendrix and Bob Seger. He plays in a heavy blues-rock style that has inspired fledgling guitar players for more than 40 years.

In an August 2006 interview on VH1 Classic, Ted Nugent remarked "I'm the only guy in rock'n'roll that plays that hollow body jazz guitar and it's because in 1960 I saw Jimmy McCarty creating those big fat full chords like I do on "Stranglehold"; I learned that from Jimmy McCarty. Remember the name Jimmy McCarty. He is as important as Bo Diddley and Chuck Berry and Les Paul...a god on guitar."

Biography 2006 – present
In 2005, Les Paul recorded Les Paul and Friends: American Made, World Played, with an all-star band. He covered "69 Freedom Special", an instrumental tune co-written by McCarty and recorded while in the Buddy Miles Express. In February 2006, Les Paul won a Grammy for his cover of the song, thus propelling McCarty into another award-winning arena as songwriter.

In 2006, he participated in a Cactus reunion, performing in New York City, Sweden, Philadelphia, and Washington, D.C. It coincided with the release of a new Cactus album, Cactus V. In 2007, Cactus played a Detroit date, a McCarty homecoming, to a sold-out, standing-room-only house. After two years in Cactus he left the band: "There were some great moments, but then there was a lot of banging heads together. Eventually I left because it was a frustrating experience for me"

In 2009, a new band, the Hell Drivers, was created. The members are Jim McCarty, Johnny "Bee" Badanjek, Marvin Conrad (bass), and Jim Edwards (vocals). A high-energy band, they play a variety of Detroit rock and roll from Iggy Pop, The Rockets, Mitch Ryder, Alice Cooper, Bob Seger and more to great critical acclaim.

On September 25, 2010,  Jim McCarty was inducted into the Canada South Blues Society "Living Blues Museum" located in Windsor, Ontario.

Jim McCarty and Carmine Appice reunited Cactus once again in 2011. This line up included singer Jimmy Kunes, bassist Pete Bremy from Vanilla Fudge, and Randy Pratt on harmonica. This incarnation lasted five years producing two live albums, TKO Tokyo: Live in Japan, An Evening in Tokyo, and a studio album, Black Dawn. They toured the United States, Europe and Japan. McCarty and Bremy left the band in late 2016.

Selective discography

Buddy Miles Express

• Expressway to Your Skull (1968)

Tracks:
 Train
 Let Your Love Light Shine
 Don't Mess With Cupid
 Funky Mule
 You're the One (That I Adore)
 I Can't Get Satisfied
 Spot on the Wall

• Electric Church (1969)

Tracks:
 Miss Lady
 69 Freedom Special
 Cigarettes & Coffee
 Destructive Love
 Texas
 My Chant
 Wrap It Up

Several tracks of Electric Church were produced by Jimi Hendrix including McCarty's Grammy Winning song, "69 Freedom Special".

Freedom Express

. Easy Ridin'  (1969) [Mercury Records]

Tracks:
 Got to Get Your Lovin'
 Who Can We Depend On?
 7-1/2
 I Just Started Livin'
 I Just Want to Be Me
 You Never Get Too Big
 Born to Be Wild 
 Tomorrow is Promised (To No One) 
 Don't Bogart Me
 The Pusher

Cactus

• Cactus (1970) [Wounded Bird Records]

Tracks:
 Parchman Farm
 My Lady from South of Detroit
 Bro. Bill
 You Can't Judge a Book by the Cover
 Let Me Swim
 No Need to Worry
 Oleo
 Feel So Good

• One Way... Or Another (1971) [Wounded Bird Records]

Tracks:
 Long Tall Sally
 Rockout, Whatever You Feel Like
 Rock 'N' Roll Children
 Big Mama Boogie, Pt. 1 & 2
 Feel So Bad
 Song for Aries
 Hometown Bust
 One Way... Or Another

• Restrictions            (1972) [Wounded Bird Records]

Tracks:
 Restrictions
 Token Chokin'
 Guiltless Glider
 Evil
 Alaska
 Sweet Sixteen
 Bag Drag
 Mean Night in Cleveland

• Cactus V                 (2006) [Escapi]

Tracks:
 Doing Time
 Muscle and Soul
 Cactus Music
 The Groover(
 High in the City
 Day for Night
 Living for Today
 Shine
 Electric Blue
 Your Brother's Helper
 Blues for Mr. Day
 Part of the Game
 Gone Train Gone
 Jazzed

• Black Dawn               (2016) [Sunset Blvd. Records]

Tracks
 Black Dawn
 Mama Bring It Home
 Dynamite
 Juggernaut
 Headed For a Fall
 You Need Love
 The Last Goodbye
 Walk a Mile
 Another Way or Another
 C-70 Blues

Jimi Hendrix

• Nine To The Universe    (1980) [Reprise Records]

Tracks played on

Jimi/Jimmy Jam

The Rockets
• Rockets 1977 Guinness Records

Tracks:
 Lufrania
 Juke-Box Daddy
 Rocket Car Wash Blues
 Feel Alright
 Rock 'N' Roll
 Working Man Blues
 Thing In "D"

• Love Transfusion 1977 Tortoise International/RCA Records

Tracks:
 Fast Thing In "D"etroit
 Fell Out Of Love
 My Heart Needs You
 Lookin' For Love
 I Got To Move
 Ramona
 Fly Little Bird
 Love Transfusion
 She's A Pretty One

• Rockets (Turn Up the Radio) 1979 RSO Records

Tracks:
 Can't Sleep
 Turn Up The Radio
 Oh Well
 Lost Forever, Left For Dreaming
 Long Long Gone
 Love Me Once Again
 Something Ain't Right
 Lucille
 Feel Alright

• No Ballads 1980 RSO Records

Tracks
 Desire
 Don't Hold On
 Restless
 Sally Can't Dance
 Takin' It Back
 Time After Time
 Sad Songs
 I Want You To Love Me
 Is It True
 Troublemaker

• Back Talk 1981 Elektra Records

Tracks:
 Back Talk
 Jealous
 Lift You Up
 Shanghaied
 Love For Hire
 I Can't Get Satisfied
 Tired Of Wearing Black
 I'll Be Your Lover
 American Dreams
 Lie To Me

• Rocket Roll 1982 Elektra Records

Tracks:
 Rollin' By The Record Machine
 Rock 'N Roll Girl
 Gonna Crash
 (I Wanna) Testify
 Gimme Your Love
 Born In Detroit
 All Night Long
 Kid With The Heart
 Rollin' And Tumblin'
 Mean Streets

• Live Rockets 1983 Capitol records

Tracks:
 Rollin' By The Record Machine
 Desire
 Can't Sleep
 Sally Can't Dance
 Takin' It Back
 Open The Door To Your Heart
 Oh Well
 Turn Up The Radio
 Born In Detroit

Detroit Blues Band

• Real Life  (1990) [Blues Factory]

Tracks:
 Back On my Feet Again
 My Life Is Ruined
 Luann
 Go Downtown
 She Knows It
 Goin' back to Memphis
 Scandalous Behavior
 Walkin Out The Door
 Treat Me Right

• Can't Get You Off My Mind (1995) [No Cover Productions]

Tracks:
 Sister's Got a Lover
 Tell Me
 Every Day I Have the Blues
 Won't You Consider
 Missing You
 She Winked Her Eye
 Too Close for Comfort
 East Side Gal
 Tears from My Eyes
 Can't Get You off My Mind

Mystery Train

• Love Lost (2001)

Tracks:
 I Need You
 Your Loss Now
 I'm all alone
 Where were you baby?
 Allman Joy
 Hold it right there
 Love is a Rough Business
 Come back to me
 I'll never turn my back on you
 Cold wind

• Lexus - Live at the Detroit International Auto Show     (2002)

Tracks:
 Rock with Me
 Honey Hush
 Need Your Love So Bad
 T-Bone shuffle
 As the years go passing by
 Help Me
 Standing on shaky ground
 Oh Well

• Kenny Parker - Hellfire - (2019) - Rock-a-While
 I've Got My Eye On You
 Baby Come Back To Me
 Blind And Paralyzed  
 Bye Bye Baby
 Hellfire
 Goin In Circles
 Dance With Me
 I'm Missing You
 But Then We Danced
 Half Crazy
 Back Up Plan
 Hard Times In The Land Of Plenty

References 

American rock guitarists
American male guitarists
1945 births
Living people
Cactus (American band) members
Guitarists from Detroit
The Detroit Wheels members
The Rockets (band) members
Buddy Miles Express members
20th-century American guitarists
20th-century American male musicians